Greta diaphanus, the Antillean clearwing, is a species of clearwing (ithomiine) butterflies, named by Dru Drury in 1773.

Description
Upperside: antennae black, and very long. thorax and abdomen dark brown. Wings transparent, vitreous (glass like). Anterior ones with the posterior edges bending as it were inwards. A small narrow border of dark brown runs entirely round the edges of these wings; and on the anterior edges, about a third from the tips, runs a dark brown streak towards the middle of the wing, close to which is a small white spot joining to the anterior edge. Posterior wings having also a very narrow border running about two-thirds round them, and stopping at the abdominal edges; some long yellowish hairs are placed on the anterior edges near the body.

Underside: palpi, breast, sides, ash-coloured. The dark brown borders surrounding the wings appear on this side of an orange-brown colour; the rest as on the upperside. Margins of the wings entire.

Wingspan  inches (57 mm).

Subspecies
Greta diaphanus diaphanus (Jamaica)
Greta diaphanus quisqueya (Fox, 1963) (Dominican Republic)

References

Ithomiini
Butterflies described in 1773
Butterflies of the Caribbean
Taxa named by Dru Drury